In anatomy, the anus is the opening at the lower end of the digestive tract.

Anus can also refer to:
 Anus language
 Anu (tribe)
 Anuš, the spelling of Enosh in the religion of Mandaeism
 Anusim, Jews forced to convert to another faith who still secretly practice Judaism
 Anus (album), an album by Alaska Thunderfuck
 Places:
 Anus, Yonne, France
 Anus, Indonesia, a small village in Indonesia
 Anus, Batangas, Philippines, in the province of Batangas
 Anus, Laguna, Philippines, a small village in the province of Laguna
 Olonets, Russia, known in the Olonets Karelian language as Anus or Anuksenlinnu

See also
 Anu (disambiguation)